Capaccio Paestum (formerly only Capaccio) is a town and comune in the province of Salerno in the Campania region of south-western Italy.  The ruins of the ancient Greek city of Paestum lie within borders of the comune.

History

Geography
Located in northern Cilento, near the mouth of Sele, Capaccio is a hill town surrounded by a plain in which resides almost all of the hamlets (frazioni) and the majority of the population, mostly concentrated at Capaccio Scalo, seat of the train station.

The municipality borders with Agropoli, Albanella, Cicerale, Eboli, Giungano, Roccadaspide and Trentinara. The hamlets are Borgo Nuovo, Capaccio Scalo, Cafasso, Chiorbo, Foce Sele, Gaiarda, Gromola, Laura, Licinella, Linora, Paestum, Ponte Barizzo, Rettifilo-Vannulo, Spinazzo, Santa Venere, Tempa di Lepre, Torre di Mare, Tempa San Paolo, and Vuccolo Maiorano.

Transport
The nearest airport is Salerno-Pontecagnano (QSR), 35 km from Capaccio.

Notable people 
 
 
 Vincenzo Romano
 Michele Siano

See also
Cilentan Coast
Cilento

Notes and references

External links

Cities and towns in Campania
Localities of Cilento